The 1912 Notre Dame Fighting Irish football team represented the University of Notre Dame during the 1912 college football season.

Second year coach John L. Marks guided Notre Dame to another undefeated season in 1912, following up a  record in 1911 with a

Schedule

References

Notre Dame
Notre Dame Fighting Irish football seasons
College football undefeated seasons
Notre Dame Fighting Irish football